The 2002 Pepsi 400 was the 17th stock car race of the 2002 NASCAR Winston Cup Series and the 44th iteration of the event. The race was held on Saturday, July 6, 2002, in Daytona Beach, Florida at Daytona International Speedway, a 2.5 miles (4.0 km) permanent triangular-shaped superspeedway. The race took the scheduled 160 laps to complete. At race's end, Michael Waltrip, driving for Dale Earnhardt, Inc., would win a crash-marred race under caution, a decision that would prove controversial with fans, as they wanted the race to finish under green. To fill out the podium, Rusty Wallace of Penske Racing and Sterling Marlin of Chip Ganassi Racing would finish second and third, respectively.

Background 

Daytona International Speedway is one of three superspeedways to hold NASCAR races, the other two being Indianapolis Motor Speedway and Talladega Superspeedway. The standard track at Daytona International Speedway is a four-turn superspeedway that is 2.5 miles (4.0 km) long. The track's turns are banked at 31 degrees, while the front stretch, the location of the finish line, is banked at 18 degrees.

Entry list 

 (R) denotes rookie driver.

Practice 
Originally, three practice sessions were scheduled to be held, with one on Thursday and two on Saturday. However, rain on Thursday would add a one-hour additional practice session to Thursday's sessions, and rain on Friday would cancel both sessions, leaving only two sessions run on Thursday.

First practice 
Originally scheduled as a two-hour practice session, the first practice session was held on Thursday, July 4, at 3:00 PM EST, but would only last for 40 minutes due to rain.

Second practice 
The second and final practice session, sometimes referred to as Happy Hour, was held on Thursday, July 4, at 8:00 PM EST, and would last for one hour.

Qualifying 
Qualifying was held on Friday, July 5, at 10:00 PM EST after rain delayed qualifying from its original date, July 4. Each driver would have two laps to set a fastest time; the fastest of the two would count as their official qualifying lap. Positions 1-36 would be decided on time, while positions 37-43 would be based on provisionals. Six spots are awarded by the use of provisionals based on owner's points. The seventh is awarded to a past champion who has not otherwise qualified for the race. If no past champ needs the provisional, the next team in the owner points will be awarded a provisional.

Two drivers would fail to qualify: Ed Berrier and Steve Grissom.

Full qualifying results

Race 
Pole sitter Kevin Harvick led the first lap of the race. The first caution did not take long as it came out on lap 2 when Tony Stewart crashed on the backstretch. Kevin Harvick led the field to the restart on lap 7. The second caution flew on lap 9 when Johnny Benson crashed in turn 3 after contact from Ken Schrader. On the restart on lap 14, Jeff Gordon took the lead from Harvick. The third caution flew on lap 17 when Mike Wallace got turned by Steve Park in the tri-oval. Jeff Burton stayed out on pit road and he was the race leader. The competition caution flew on lap 25. Before they took the green flag for the restart, Jeff Gordon came down pit road due to speculation that Gordon had a flat tire. Gordon ended up going a lap down. The race restarted on lap 30. On lap 43, Sterling Marlin took the lead from Jeff Burton. On lap 59, the 5th caution flew when Kenny Wallace crashed in turn 4. Michael Waltrip won the race off of pit road and he was the new race leader on the restart on lap 64. Green flag pit stops began on lap 114. Dale Earnhardt Jr. led when Waltrip pitted on lap 118. On lap 119, Michael Waltrip got his lead back. With 35 laps to go, the 6th caution flew when Tony Stewart spun off of turn 2.

Final laps 
The race restarted with 30 laps to go in the race. With 25 laps to go, the big one struck heading into turn 1 taking out 14 cars. It started when Jeff Burton hooked Dale Jarrett in the left rear which caused Jarrett to turn left then turn his car back to the right, right in front of a pack of cars. During the wreck, Joe Nemechek got hooked by the spinning Jarrett and spun into Burton. Nemechek's car went up the racetrack and pounded the outside wall head on in turn 1. Also, Mike Skinner spun in the wreck and went up in front of Brett Bodine destroying Bodine's front end and catching Bodine's car on fire. After the hard hit into the outside wall, Nemechek would walk away but suffered a bruised left foot. The cars involved were Dale Jarrett, Jeff Burton, Brett Bodine, Jeremy Mayfield, Mike Skinner, Bobby Labonte, Joe Nemechek, Steve Park, Matt Kenseth, Terry Labonte, Ricky Rudd, Jimmie Johnson, Geoff Bodine, and Kyle Petty. The race restarted with 16 laps to go and Michael Waltrip led over his DEI teammate Dale Earnhardt Jr. With 11 laps to go, the 8th caution flew for debris in turn 2. The race restarted with 6 laps to go and Michael Waltrip kept his lead. With 4 laps to go, the 9th and final caution flew for a 3 car crash on the backstretch involving Ryan Newman, Jeff Green, and Dave Blaney. Dale Earnhardt Jr. fell back from 2nd to 6th when the caution came out. In the previous years' race, Jr. restarted 6th with 6 laps to go in the race and powered his way up to the lead in 2 laps and won that race. The fans thought it could happen again and wanted NASCAR to red flag the race so they could get back going again. But NASCAR decided to keep the caution flag in the air and the race ended up finishing under caution and Michael Waltrip took home his second win of his Cup Series career. Rusty Wallace, Sterling Marlin, Jimmy Spencer, and Mark Martin rounded out the top 5 while Dale Earnhardt Jr., Todd Bodine, Jimmie Johnson, Ward Burton, and Geoff Bodine rounded out the top 10. Frustrated with NASCAR's decision, fans on the backstretch threw lawn chairs, beer bottles, and a bunch of garbage onto the racetrack after Waltrip took the checkered flag.

Race results

References 

2002 NASCAR Winston Cup Series
NASCAR races at Daytona International Speedway
July 2002 sports events in the United States
2002 in sports in Florida